The Nepal Multipurpose Cooperative Society Ltd.  was established in 1994 March 8 by 26 Founder Members. It was established first with Shree Bachat Tatha Rin Sahakari Sanstha Li. and received authorization from Nepal Rastra Bank to run Limited Banking transactions. Later, Nepal Multipurpose Cooperative Society Ltd. was added as a name change.

References

External links 
 

Cooperatives in Nepal
Banks of Nepal
1994 establishments in Nepal